"My Mamma Said" is a song by Danish-Norwegian pop band Aqua. The song was written by members Søren Rasted and Lene Nystrøm, and produced by Rasted, for their second greatest hits album (2009). It was released as the second single from the album, following "Back to the 80's".

Background and composition
“My Mamma Said" deals with emotions and considerations concerning the death of the narrator’s mother. The dominant instruments are the piano and the cello. Nystrom is the principal vocalist and her part concerns fears and reflections about her mother, while Rene Dif's part pertains to philosophical and scientific aspects of the mother’s death.

Music video
The music video was directed by Rasmus Laumann. It premiered on October 23, 2009. The video is mainly set in a closed room with the four members of Aqua seated around a table, amid a bed of dry leaves. Apart from the leaves, black and white dominate the clip.

Chart performance
"My Mamma Said" at number eleven on the chart issued June 26, 2009 following the album's release due to strong digital sales. The following week it fell to number thirty-eight. On November 13, 2009 the song re-entered the chart at number twenty-three. In its fifth week on the chart, "My Mamma Said" peaked at number four. In January 2010, the song was certified gold by the International Federation of the Phonographic Industry (IFPI) for sales of 7,500 copies in Denmark.

Charts and certifications

Charts

Year-end Charts

Certifications

References

2009 singles
Aqua (band) songs
Songs written by Lene Nystrøm
Songs written by Søren Rasted
2009 songs